Project X Zone 2 is a crossover tactical role-playing game for the Nintendo 3DS developed by Monolith Soft and published by Bandai Namco Entertainment. Despite the game being the sequel to Project X Zone, the plot is a homage to the events of its spiritual predecessor, Namco × Capcom, while retaining a standalone story. The game is a crossover between various franchises from Bandai Namco, Capcom, and Sega, with special guests from Nintendo. The game was released in Japan in November 2015, and worldwide in February 2016.

Plot 

Shibuya, Tokyo has been the locked down because of paranormal events. Two organizations had previously fought there. Shinra, a secret organization dedicated to protecting the Earth from otherworldly threats and Ouma, an evil organization who use dimensional rifts to conquer the world. After their defeat, all seemed well. But rifts have started appearing once more. Agents of Shinra, Reiji and Xiaomu, meet with Chris Redfield and Jill Valentine of the BSAA to investigate the appearance of mysterious golden chains that have appeared in Shibuya, which seem to be causing strong rifts in space-time. While investigating, they stumble across Heihachi, Phoenix Wright, Maya Fey, Goro Majima, and Kazuma Kiryu. This marks the start of an adventure that crosses into several worlds, where they meet with characters whose worlds have also been affected by these rifts.

Gameplay

Like its predecessor, Project X Zone is a tactical role-playing game in which players strategically maneuver their characters across a field to battle with the enemy. Characters are paired up into Pair Units, with Solo Units consisting of a single character able to assist them when linked together. In battle, players use well-timed attacks and combos to do as much damage to the opponent as possible before their turn ends.

Characters
Like its predecessor, Project X Zone 2 features pairs of characters from three Japanese video game companies (Bandai Namco Entertainment, Capcom, and Sega), as well as solo characters who can provide assist attacks during combat. The game also features Nintendo characters as special guests for the first time. A total of 58 characters are playable in the game.

Pair units

 Reiji Arisu and Xiaomu from Namco × Capcom
 Jin Kazama and Kazuya Mishima from Tekken
 Kite and Haseo from .hack and .hack//G.U.
 Yuri Lowell and Flynn Scifo from Tales of Vesperia
 Ciel Alençon and Nana Kazuki from God Eater 2
 KOS-MOS and Fiora from Xenosaga and Xenoblade Chronicles
 Chris Redfield and Jill Valentine from Resident Evil
 Ryu and Ken Masters from Street Fighter
 Demitri Maximoff and Morrigan Aensland from Darkstalkers
 Dante and Vergil from Devil May Cry
 X and Zero from Mega Man X
 Strider Hiryu and Hotsuma from Strider and Shinobi
 Chun-Li and Ling Xiaoyu from Street Fighter and Tekken
 Akira Yuki and Kage-Maru from Virtua Fighter
 Ichirō Ōgami and Erica Fontaine from Sakura Wars
 Sakura Shinguji and Gemini Sunrise from Sakura Wars
 Kazuma Kiryu and Goro Majima from Like A Dragon
 Zephyr and Vashyron from Resonance of Fate
 Chrom and Lucina from Fire Emblem Awakening

Solo units

 Heihachi Mishima from Tekken
 Natsu from Soulcalibur V
 Aty from Summon Night 3
 Valkyrie from Valkyrie no Bōken: Toki no Kagi Densetsu
 Alisa Illinichina Amiella from God Eater
 Estellise Sidos Heurassein from Tales of Vesperia
 Captain Commando from Captain Commando
 June Lin Milliam from Star Gladiator
 Leon S. Kennedy from Resident Evil
 Phoenix Wright  and Maya Fey from Ace Attorney
 Felicia from Darkstalkers
 Ingrid from Capcom Fighting Jam
 Axel Stone from Streets of Rage
 Hibana from Nightshade
 Segata Sanshiro
 Ulala from Space Channel 5
 Pai Chan from Virtua Fighter
 Leanne from Resonance of Fate
 Ryo Hazuki from Shenmue

Development
On April 8, 2015, Famitsu.com launched a teaser website with a countdown that would expire in five days, revealing a secret project from Bandai Namco Entertainment. Before its expiration, Project X Zone 2 was announced early to attendees of Bandai Namco's "Level Up" press event in Milan, Italy on April 10, which was prematurely posted on Italian news website E-duesse before being retracted. The game was officially revealed to the public three days later. It was confirmed in an interview that the game will address the criticisms of the original (such as the story) and that there will be some "surprise" announcements. The game was originally going to have a simultaneous worldwide release, but the North American and European releases were later delayed to early 2016. Unlike the previous game, the western versions features no altered content from the Japanese version and are in multiple languages.

The game's opening and ending themes, "Sekai wa Hitotsu no Butai" (All the World's Stage), and "Tsuki Akari no Curtain Call" (Moonlight Curtain Call) were both performed by marina. The lyrics were written by director Soichiro Morizumi, and the themes were composed by Yuzo Koshiro. Koshiro had previously composed the theme of Namco × Capcom, Brave New World, and this time Morizumi asked him to compose a song that was more akin to battle music. Koshiro decided to go with a rock theme, and found that marina's vocals were perfect for the song. marina expressed that while she found the song difficult to sing, she thought it turned out very well.

The game's opening animation was produced by Graphinica and directed by veteran animator Yasutoshi Iwasaki.

Reception

Project X Zone 2 received mixed to positive reviews, receiving a score of 73/100 on Metacritic, with critics praising the game's cast of characters and improvements to issues present in the first game, but criticizing the game's easy difficulty and the fact that many assets were reused from the first game. The game received a 32/40 from Famitsu. Hardcore Gamer gave the game a 4/5 saying, "Project X Zone 2 is a funny, charming and amusing title. It sets out to entertain video game fans of all stripes and allows the player to jump from world to world to get a taste of other titles they may have been missing. Just based on the built-in "Crosspedia" encyclopedia database, the stack of games that I really want to try out has grown (Resonance of Fate, in particular). It's not challenging, but it was never meant to be. The gameplay is simply the vehicle to deliver the true focus of this title: dumb fun. Players who don't need everything to bristle with a dark malevolence will find a great time in this one."

Sales
The game sold 37,000 copies in Japan on its first week, selling through 60% of its shipment. The game made the #2 spot in the UK 3DS sales charts.

Legacy 
In an interview with Nintendo Life, Kensuke Tsukanaka stated that he would like to continue the series.

Hideki Kamiya of PlatinumGames has stated he was approached about having Sega character Bayonetta included in this game, to which he refused as he wanted Bayonetta and Dante from Devil May Cry to meet "on his own terms". However, he has stated he has come to regret this decision due to realizing how the fans would have loved the two interacting, and that if there is a Project X Zone 3 he would be all for Bayonetta's inclusion.

Notes

References

External links
 

2015 video games
Bandai Namco games
Capcom games
Crossover role-playing video games
Fictional government investigations of the paranormal
Monolith Soft games
Video games about ninja
Nintendo 3DS games
Nintendo 3DS eShop games
Nintendo 3DS-only games
Nintendo Network games
Nintendo games
Roppongi
Sega video games
Shibuya
Tactical role-playing video games
Video games about time travel
Urban fantasy video games
Video games featuring female protagonists
Video games about parallel universes
Video game sequels
Video games developed in Japan